Stonewall Democrats, also known in some states as LGBT Democrats, is a caucus within the Democratic Party that advocates for issues that are relevant to LGBT Americans. The caucus primarily operates through individual chapters or political clubs supporting LGBT rights and affiliated with the Democratic Party.

History

In 1971, Alice B. Toklas Memorial Democratic Club of San Francisco was the first registered LGBT Democratic club in the nation.

In 1975, the Stonewall Democratic Club was established in Los Angeles, California, the first 'Stonewall Democratic Club' in the country established for LGBT individuals and straight allies committed to achieving equality for all and to advancing progressive and feminist values through the Democratic Party.

National Stonewall Democratic Federation

The National Stonewall Democratic Federation was a national organization of LGBT Democratic clubs and individuals. It was founded on May 8–10, 1998, in Kansas City, Missouri. On January 1, 2013, National Stonewall Democratic Federation suspended operations due to a financial deficit of $30,000.

List of chapters

Alabama
Active
 Alabama Stonewall Democrats

Arkansas 
Active
 Stonewall Democratic Caucus of Arkansas
 Young Democrats of Arkansas Stonewall Caucus

Arizona 
Active
 Stonewall Democrats of Arizona

California 
Active
 Alice B. Toklas LGBT Democratic Club
 Central Valley Stonewall Democratic Club
 Desert Stonewall Democrats
 East Bay Stonewall Democratic Club
 Fresno Stonewall Democrats
 Harvey Milk Lesbian, Gay, Bisexual, Transgender Democratic Club
 Long Beach Lambda Democratic Club
 San Diego Democrats for Equality
 Stonewall Democratic Club
 Stonewall Young Democrats
 Stonewall Democrats Sacramento
 Stonewall Democrats of Tuolumne County
 Stonewall Democrats of Ventura County
 Tulare County Stonewall Democrats

Colorado 
Active
 Stonewall Democrats of Colorado
 Jeffco Dems LGBTQ Caucus
 Stonewall Democrats of Pikes Peak

Delaware 
Active
 Barbara Gittings Delaware Stonewall Democrats

Democrats Abroad 
Active
 LGBT Caucus

District of Columbia 
Active
 Gertrude Stein Democratic Club DC

Florida 
Active
 Florida LGBTA Democratic Caucus
 Stonewall Democrats of Alachua County
 Capital City GLBTA Democratic Caucus
 Dolphin Democrats
 Freedom Democrats
 Hillsborough County LGBTA Democratic Caucus
 Manatee LGBTA Democratic Caucus
 Rainbow Democratic Club of Orange County
 Stonewall Democrats of Pinellas County

Georgia 
Active
 Georgia Stonewall Democrats

Hawaii 
Active
 LGBT Caucus of the Democratic Party of Hawai'i

Iowa 
Active
 Iowa Democratic Stonewall Caucus
 Linn County Stonewall Democrats

Idaho 
Active
 LGBTA Democratic Caucus of Idaho

Indiana 
Active
 Indiana Stonewall Democrats

Kansas 
Active
 Kansas Democratic LGBT Caucus

Louisiana 
Active
 Louisiana Stonewall Democrats

Maryland
Active
 Young Democrats of Maryland LGBT Caucus

Massachusetts 
Active
 Bay State Stonewall Democrats

Michigan 
Active
 The LGBT and Allies Caucus of the Michigan Democratic Party
 Stonewall Democrats at the University of Michigan

Minnesota 
Active
 Stonewall DFL

Missouri 
Active
 Four Freedoms Democratic Club
 Kansas City Pride Democratic Club
 Stonewall Democrats of Eastern Missouri

Mississippi
Active
 Mississippi Stonewall Democrats

Montana 
Active
 Montana Stonewall Democrats

Nebraska 
Active
 Nebraska Stonewall Democrats

Nevada 
Active
 Stonewall Northern Nevada
 Stonewall Democratic Club of Southern Nevada

New Hampshire 
Active
 New Hampshire Stonewall Democrats

New Jersey 
Active
 New Jersey Stonewall Democrats

New York 
Active
 Stonewall Democratic Club (Stonewall Democrats) of New York City
 Jim Owles Liberal Democratic Club
 Lambda Independent Democrats of Brooklyn
 Lesbian and Gay Democratic Club of Queens
 Gay & Lesbian Independent Democrats (of New York County)
 GLBT Democrats of Long Island
 Stonewall Democrats of Western New York
 Bronx Rainbow Democratic Coalition
 Hudson Valley Stonewall Democrats

North Carolina 
Active
 LGBT Democrats of North Carolina
 LGBT Democrats of Gaston County
 New Hanover County Democratic Party - Stonewall Democrats

Ohio 
Active
  Cleveland Stonewall Democrats
 Mahoning Valley Stonewall Democrats
 Stonewall Democrats of Central Ohio
 Stonewall Democrats of Summit County

Oklahoma 
Active

 Oklahoma Stonewall Democrats

Pennsylvania 
Active
 Liberty City LGBT Democratic Club
 Steel City Stonewall Democrats
 Capital Region Stonewall Democrats

South Carolina
Inactive
 South Carolina Stonewall Democrats

Tennessee
Inactive
Tennessee Stonewall Democratic Caucus

Texas 
Active
 Texas Stonewall Democrats
 East Texas Stonewall Democrats
 Houston Area Stonewall Democrats
 Houston Stonewall Young Democrats
 Stonewall Democrats Denton County
 Stonewall Democrats of Austin
 Stonewall Democrats Central Texas
 Stonewall Democrats of Dallas
 Dallas Stonewall Young Democrats
 Stonewall Democrats of Lubbock
 Stonewall Democrats of San Antonio
 Stonewall Democrats-Rio Grande Valley
 Stonewall Democrats Tarrant County
 Texas Young Democrats Stonewall Caucus
 Bastrop County Stonewall Democrats
 Chisholm Trail Stonewall Democrats of Johnson County

Utah 
Active
 Stonewall Democrats Utah

Virginia 
Active
 LGBT Democrats of Virginia

Washington 
Active

  Washington State Stonewall Caucus Democrats

 Clark County Stonewall Caucus Democrats

Wisconsin
Inactive

 WI Stonewall Democrats

See also

 Democratic Party
 List of LGBT rights organizations
 Log Cabin Republicans

References

Democratic Party (United States) organizations
Factions in the Democratic Party (United States)
LGBT affiliate organizations of political parties
LGBT liberalism
LGBT political advocacy groups in the United States
1975 establishments in California
Political organizations established in 1971
Political organizations established in 1975